The Dagar Brothers are one of two generations of singers of the Indian classical music vocal genre dhrupad:

 Senior Dagar Brothers, Nasir Moinuddin Dagar (1919-1966) and Nasir Aminuddin Dagar (1923-2000)
 Younger Dagar Brothers, Zahiruddin Dagar (1933–1994) and Faiyazuddin Dagar (1934–1989)

See also
 :Category:Dagarvani, including articles on other members of the Dagar family

Dagarvani